Texas Beach Skate Park, also known as
Treasure Island Community Skate Park, is a DIY
skatepark located within the planned Riverview Community Park in the
Texas Beach riverside area on the north bank of the James River in
Richmond, Virginia, United States.

Under ongoing construction and expansion by a group of local-area skateboarders
and volunteers, with additional support and organizational assistance from the
Richmond Area Skateboard Alliance (RASA), the
skatepark comprises two separate concrete slabs, the older lower level
consisting of the original Texas Beach DIY skate spot, and the newer upper
level poured in 2019.  With ongoing development
sanctioned by the City of Richmond, but without direct financial support from
the Richmond Department of Parks, Recreation, and Community Facilities,
construction and expansion of the skatepark continue to be undertaken purely
by the efforts of local skateboarders and volunteers with donated concrete,
coping, and other materials.

Texas Beach Skate Park is the second public skatepark in the City of Richmond,
and the first and only public skatepark in the City north of the river.  In
contrast to Carter Jones Skate Park, the city’s first public
skatepark on southside and the only one officially opened and formally
dedicated by the city, the skate park has a strong volunteer culture and DIY
vibe.

Elements
The original lower slab (the original Texas Beach DIY skate spot) features
a quarter pipe with center pad, a six-foot-high bowl corner,
and two rails; this lower slab has a rougher concrete surface
that more closely mimics typical street skating conditions.  The newer upper
slab, with a recently poured concrete surface at a slight inclination, features
two adjoined manual pads of differing heights (with coping); this upper slab
features a very smooth concrete surface that is ideal for beginning
skateboarders learning how to skate.  An additional bowl corner is also connected over a hump to the lower slab.  The two
slabs, at different elevations, are connected by a fixed rail; construction of
a concrete ramp to connect the upper and lower slabs is a tentative future
project.  As a DIY skatepark, numerous additional movable rails, construction
barriers, wooden pads, ramps, and raw construction materials are available on
site for use by skateboarders.

See also

 Skateparks in Virginia
 Carter Jones Skate Park
 Ashland Skate Park

References

External links

 
 

Skateparks in the United States
Parks in Richmond, Virginia